The Salvation Army Ray & Joan Kroc Corps Community Centers, or Kroc Centers, is a group of community centers run by the Salvation Army.

Kroc Center background
Upon her death in 2003, Joan Kroc, the widow of McDonald's restaurants executive Ray Kroc, bequeathed $1.5 billion to The Salvation Army solely for the purpose of establishing centers of opportunity, education, recreation and inspiration throughout the United States to be known as "Salvation Army Ray and Joan Kroc Corps Community Centers".

Prior to her death, $87 million was donated to build and endow the first Kroc Center in San Diego, California on what was a grocery store that was abandoned in the early 1990s and other empty land. The money was donated in 1998 and the center opened in June 2002. Currently, it is home to the San Diego Wildcats of the American Basketball Association's current incarnation.

The Kroc Center in San Francisco, California broke ground in June 2006, and the Kroc Center in Atlanta, Georgia, formally known as The Salvation Army Ray and Joan Kroc Center: A Center for Worship and Education, broke ground in 2007. The San Francisco Kroc Center received $53 million.

References

Locationsretrieved on 15 October 2006 
San Francisco Kroc centerretrieved on 15 October 2006 
The Kroc Center Coeur d'Aleneretrieved on 19 December 2008 

The Salvation Army
Organizations established in 2003